Julien Bonetat (born 28 June 1971 in Tours) was a professional squash player who represented France. He reached a career-high world ranking of World No. 13 in November 1996. Bonetat represented France during the 1989 World Team Squash Championships.

References

External links 
 
 

1971 births
Living people
French male squash players
Sportspeople from Tours, France